Pavel Gurkin (born 12 July 1966) is a Russian sport shooter who specializes in the trap.

At the 2008 Olympic Games he finished in joint tenth place in the trap qualification, missing a place among the top six, who progressed to the final round.

References

1966 births
Living people
Russian male sport shooters
Shooters at the 2008 Summer Olympics
Olympic shooters of Russia
Trap and double trap shooters